is a 2009 tactical role-playing game developed by Sazanami and published by Namco Bandai Games for the Wii.

Gameplay
NEO is the first Super Robot Wars title to appear on the Wii. NEO carries on from Super Robot Wars GC and Super Robot Wars XO by using 3D models for the battle animations, rather than the standard 2D sprite animation which the Super Robot Wars series is known for. NEO also stands out as the many anime series featured were shows aimed at a younger audience, three of the titles making a debut: Haō Taikei Ryū Knight, NG Knight Lamune & 40 and Shippū! Iron Leaguer originated in the early-to-mid-90s "chibi robo" style of robot anime marketed to children, in which the robots were presented with super-deformed proportions. Most of the Eldran series also make their first appearance in this game.

Super Robot Wars NEO introduces many new gameplay features to the Super Robot Wars franchise, such as a gridless map system, wherein movement is displayed as a radius as opposed to a number of squares on the grid. Movement is possible in any direction, terrain barriers and blocking units notwithstanding.

NEO also introduces a new battle system, in which most common attacks take place on the map instead of cutting away to the battle screen. Additionally, terrain barriers such as walls can restrict the range of many attacks. Certain attacks have effects that directly influence the map: attacking all targets in a straight line while moving the attacker past them, travelling over terrain barriers to hit enemies behind them, or pushing enemies back, possibly incurring damage if they hit walls or are pushed off ledges.

Reception

Notes

References

External links
Official Site 

2009 video games
Bandai Namco games
Wii games
Wii-only games
Japan-exclusive video games
Super Robot Wars
Video games developed in Japan
Jushin Liger